Children of Divorce is a 1939 Danish drama film directed by Benjamin Christensen.

Cast
 Grethe Holmer as Vibeke
 Mathilde Nielsen
 Johannes Meyer as Kunstmaleren
 Sonja Steincke
 Svend Fridberg as Skørtejægeren
 Ellen Malberg
 Carlo Wieth
 Stina Hedberg
 Petrine Sonne

References

External links
 

1939 films
1939 drama films
Danish drama films
1930s Danish-language films
Danish black-and-white films
Films directed by Benjamin Christensen